Jesse John Sailes (1919–2007) was a jazz drummer and session musician who performed on many hit records in the 1940s and 1950s such as Eddie Cochran's "Skinny Jim" and The Coasters' Riot in Cell Block Number 9, Framed, and Searchin'.

He was born in Denver, Colorado on December 3, 1919.  He lived and worked in Los Angeles where he died on September 5, 2007.

References

1919 births
2007 deaths
Musicians from Denver
American jazz drummers
American session musicians